Days of Eclipse (or,  The Days of Eclipse, Dni Zatmenija, Días de eclipse) is a 1988 Soviet film directed by Alexander Sokurov. The screenplay is by Yuri Arabov and Pyotr Kadochnikov based on a screenplay by Arkady and Boris Strugatsky, which is in turn based on their 1974 novel  Definitely Maybe.

Plot 
A recently qualified medical doctor, Dmitri Malyanov, has taken a posting to a remote and very poor part of Soviet Turkmenistan. On top of his day job as a pediatrician Malyanov is undertaking research into the effects of religious practice on human health. His research has drawn the politically incorrect conclusion that religious faith does indeed improve health. However, as he attempts to write up his thesis, various sorts of improbable, bizarre events take place one after another. Malyanov perceives that some force is preventing him from completing his research.

Production 
In the novel, the protagonist who works on research in astrophysics is similarly confounded by a mysterious force trying to interfere and impede his research. Days of Eclipse is filmed using unusual cinematographic techniques in a half-documentary manner where black-and-white and sepia frames alternate with color. Sokurov chose for the film's location the town in Turkmenistan where he had spent his childhood as the son of an Army officer.

Cast 
The film features a cast of non-professionals.
 Aleksei Ananishnov as Malyanov
 Eskender Umarov as Vecherovsky
 Irina Sokolova as Malyanov's Sister
 Vladimir Zamansky as Snegovoy
 Kirill Dudkin as Gluchov
 Aleksei Yankovsky as Snegovoy's Father
 Viktor Belovolsky as Gubar
 Sergei Krylov as Little Boy

Awards 
 European Film Awards (Special Award for Best Music) of European Film Academy of 1988 to the composer Yuri Khanin
 Nika Award of the Union of Cinematographers of USSR for the best 1989 sound work to Vladimir Persov
 Composer Yuri Khanin was also nominated for 1989 Nika for the best music

References

External links

  Days of Eclipse commentary by Irina Graschenkova

Films based on works by Arkady and Boris Strugatsky
Soviet science fiction drama films
1988 films
1988 in the Soviet Union
Films directed by Alexander Sokurov
Lenfilm films
1980s Russian-language films
Films based on science fiction novels
Films based on Russian novels
1980s science fiction drama films
1988 drama films